Kapp is a village in Østre Toten Municipality in Innlandet county, Norway. Kapp has summer ferry connections to Gjøvik, Tingnes, and Hamar.

This makes it the largest urban settlement in all of Østre Toten.

Kapp has varied small industries, including aluminum production for boats and equipment for the oil industry at Kapp Aluminium. The old Kapp milk factory buildings have been turned into a museum. Just south of the village is the Peder Balke Center which hosts art exhibitions and other events.

Name
The area was historically called Smørvika, but the area was named Kapp when the milk factories were built on the site towards the end of the 19th century. Kapp is probably used here for "headland" or "promontory".

References

Østre Toten
Villages in Innlandet